Punata Municipality is the first municipal section of the Punata Province in the Cochabamba Department, Bolivia. Its capital is Punata. At the time of census 2001 the municipality had 26,140 inhabitants.

Cantons 

The municipality consists of only one canton, Punata Canton. It is identical to the municipality.

Government 
The government of Punata Municipality is divided into the executive and legislative branches. The Mayor of Punata is the head of the city government, elected for a term of five years by general election. The legislative branch consists of the Municipal Council, which elects a President, Vice President and Secretary from a group of seven members.

The current mayor of Punata is Leticia Camacho, who has served in that post on an interim basis, since the removal of Víctor Balderrama, who won both of the previous two elections. Balderrama, of the Insurgente Martín Uchu party, was suspended under indictment for aggravated rape of a minor on August 10, 2010 (for which he was convicted September 2011), and resigned to resign to allow new elections. A special election for mayor was scheduled to be held on 13 January 2013.

Víctor Balderrama Arias won a strong majority of 74% in the 4 April 2010 elections and his party, Insurgente Martín Uchu, controls five of the seven council seats.

References 

 [http://obd.descentralizacion.gov.bo/municipal/fichas/ ''Observatorio Bolivia Democrático''] (Spanish)

External links 
 Map of Punata Province

Municipalities of the Cochabamba Department